UFC on Fox: Werdum vs. Browne (also known as UFC on Fox 11) was a mixed martial arts event held by the Ultimate Fighting Championship on April 19, 2014, at the Amway Center in Orlando, Florida.

Background
The event was headlined by a heavyweight number one contenders bout between Fabrício Werdum and Travis Browne.

Sean Soriano was expected to face Estevan Payan at this event. However, Soriano was forced to pull out due to injury and was replaced by Mike Brown. In turn, Brown was forced out of the bout and was replaced by promotional newcomer Alex White.

Amanda Nunes was expected to face UFC newcomer Alexis Dufresne on this card, but the bout was cancelled when Dufresne was injured.

Santiago Ponzinibbio was expected to face Jordan Mein at this event. However, Ponzinibbio was removed from the bout and was replaced by Hernani Perpetuo.

Josh Samman was expected to face Caio Magalhães at the event. However, on April 8, Samman pulled out of the bout citing a hamstring injury and was replaced by promotional newcomer Luke Zachrich.

The event had an average of 2.5 million viewers with 3.3 million viewers during the main event.

Results

Bonus awards
The following fighters were awarded $50,000 bonuses:
 Fight of the Night: Thiago Alves vs. Seth Baczynski
 Performance of the Night: Donald Cerrone and Alex White

Reported payout
The following is the reported payout to the fighters as reported to the Florida State Boxing Commission. It does not include sponsor money and also does not include the UFC's traditional "fight night" bonuses.

 Fabrício Werdum: $175,000 (includes $50,000 win bonus) def. Travis Browne: $50,000
 Miesha Tate: $56,000 (includes $28,000 win bonus) def. Liz Carmouche: $17,000
 Donald Cerrone: $114,000 (includes $57,000 win bonus) def. Edson Barboza: $29,000
 Yoel Romero: $50,000 (includes $25,000 win bonus) def. Brad Tavares: $19,000
 Khabib Nurmagomedov: $64,000 (includes $32,000 win bonus) def. Rafael dos Anjos: $21,000
 Thiago Alves: $78,000 (includes $39,000 win bonus) def. Seth Baczynski: $20,000
 Jorge Masvidal: $78,000 (includes $39,000 win bonus) def. Pat Healy: $25,000
 Alex White: $16,000 (includes $8,000 win bonus) def. Estevan Payan: $10,000
 Caio Magalhaes: $24,000 (includes $12,000 win bonus) def. Luke Zachrich: $8,000
 Jordan Mein: $36,000 (includes $18,000 win bonus) def. Hernani Perpetuo: $8,000
 Dustin Ortiz: $20,000 (includes $10,000 win bonus) def. Ray Borg: $8,000
 Mirsad Bektić: $16,000 (includes $8,000 win bonus) def. Chas Skelly: $8,000
 Derrick Lewis: $16,000 (includes $8,000 win bonus) def. Jack May: $8,000

See also
List of UFC events
2014 in UFC

References

Fox UFC
Events in Orlando, Florida
Mixed martial arts in Florida
Sports competitions in Orlando, Florida
2014 in mixed martial arts